Protein KIBRA also known as kidney and brain expressed protein (KIBRA) or WW domain-containing protein 1 (WWC1) is a protein that in humans is encoded by the WWC1 gene.

Research on human memory 
A single nucleotide polymorphism  (rs17070145)  in the gene has been associated with human memory performance in one 2006 study. While no significant support for KIBRA's association with memory was found in a 2008 study with 584 subjects, the original 2006 study was replicated in a smaller sample of an elderly population in 2008.  A subsequent study in 2009 in two large UK samples indicated that KIBRA is specifically associated with forgetting of non-semantic material.

Studies have also begun to investigate the role of KIBRA in Alzheimer's disease.

Interactions 
KIBRA has at least 10 interaction partners, including synaptopodin, PKCζ and  Dendrin, most of which modify synaptic plasticity.
For instance, Dendrin is  a post-synaptic protein with expression regulated by sleep deprivation.
KIBRA has been shown to interact with Protein kinase Mζ.

References

Further reading

External links 
 Division of Cognitive Neuroscience, University of Basel, Switzerland